Lucky Miles is a 2007 Australian drama feature film based on several true stories involving people entering Western Australia by boat in order to seek asylum. Its director was Michael James Rowland and its producers were Jo Dyer and Lesley Dyer.

Synopsis
An Indonesian fishing boat abandons a group of Iraqi and Cambodian men on a remote part of the Western Australian coast in 1990. Told there is a bus over the dunes, the men are abandoned to a desert the size of Poland. While most are quickly rounded up, three men with little in common but their history of misfortune elude capture and begin an epic but confused journey drawn on by their hopes amplified by the empty desert. Pursued by an army reservist unit more concerned with playing ball sports and music, the three protagonists wander deeper into trouble, searching desperately among the harsh beauty of the Pilbara for evidence of a Western, liberal democracy or the promised bus, which only one of them finds.

Cast

 Kenneth Moraleda - Arun
 Rodney Afif - Youssif
 Sri Sacdpreseuth - Ramelan
 Don Hany - Plank
 Glenn Shea - O'Shane
 Sean Mununggurr - Tom
 Sawung Jabo - Muluk
 Arif Hidayat - Abdu
 Deborah Mailman - Lisa
 Majid Shokor - Salah
 Osamah Sami - Fiark
 Edwin Hodgeman - Coote
 Gillian Jones - Chris
 Gerard Kennedy - Shooter
 Geoff Morrell - Peter Coode

Production
Shot on location in South Australia and Cambodia Lucky Miles is the feature debut from Adelaide-born Michael James Rowland. With a script developed by Rowland's company Puncture, Lucky Miles is produced by Jo Dyer and Lesley Dyer, co-written by Helen Barnes, shot by cinematographer Geoff Burton, edited by Henry Dangar, music supervision by WOMAD's Artistic Director Thomas Brooman, scored by percussionist Trilok Gurtu and executive produced by Michael Bourchier. Lucky Miles is presented by Film Finance Corporation Australia, Short of Easy, The South Australian Film Corporation and the 2007 Adelaide Film Festival.

Release
Lucky Miles premiered on opening night of the 2007 Adelaide Film Festival.

Lucky Miles also screened at world cinema festivals, including Jerusalem, Womad, Pusan, Chicago, AFI (USA) and the Amazonas Film Festival in Manaus. Lucky Miles opened in Australia mid-July and was released internationally during 2007. CineClick Asia is the film's global releasing company and Lucky Miles is distributed on DVD (Region Four) by Madman, released on 7 December 2007. Lucky Miles was shown in the 10th 2008 Philippines Cinemanila International Film Festival at Malacañan Palace's Kalayaan Hall. Kenneth Moraleda won the Vic Silayan Award for best actor.

Reception
Reviews of the film were featured in Variety, The Age and The Advertiser.

Box office
Lucky Miles grossed $678,110 at the box office in Australia.

Accolades
The film won the following awards:

Audience Award for Best Film at the 2007 Sydney Film Festival
Special Jury Prize at the 42nd Karlovy Vary International Film Festival in the Czech Republic
Best Screenplay at the Vladivostok International Film Festival, an award that carries with it a Russian publishing deal
 Black Pearl for Best New Director at the Middle East International Film Festival, worth AED300,000 in cash
 Grand Prix at the 9th Rencontres Internationales du Cinéma des Antipodes in Saint-Tropez, France
 Best Film at the 3rd Asian Festival of First Films in Singapore

It was nominated for the following awards:
Best Screenplay at the 2007 Asia Pacific Screen Awards
Best Film and Best Screenplay at the 2007 Australian Film Institute Awards
Best Film and Screenplay at the 2007 IF Awards

See also
 Cinema of Australia

References

External links 

2007 films
2007 comedy-drama films
Australian comedy-drama films
Films set in Western Australia
2007 comedy films
2007 drama films
2000s English-language films